Uro Care Hospital is a private, specialized healthcare facility in Uganda. It is a specialists' hospital and diagnostic centre focusing primarily on the areas of urology and nephrology. The facility is owned, operated and administered by Ugandan healthcare professionals.

Location

The geographical coordinates of Uro Care Hospital are: 0°21'12.0"N, 32°32'07.0"E (Latitude:0.353333; Longitude:32.535278).

History
In 2006, Dr Stephen Watya, a consultant urologist, trained at Makerere University and the University of Cape Town, registered Uro Care Limited, as a private company limited by shares. In 2017, that company established Uro Care Hospital with focus on diseases of the kidneys, urinary bladder and the urinary tract.

Hospital departments
The services offered at Uro Care Hospital, are dispensed under the following departments: 1. Operating Theatre 2. Inpatient Department 3. Outpatient Department 4. Laboratory 5. Pharmacy and 6. Imaging Department.

Services
, the following services are on offer at Uro Care Hospital. The list is not exhaustive:
1. General Urological Surgery 2. Physician Anesthesia 3. Laparoscopic Surgery of Kidneys, Ureters, Urinary Bladder and Prostate 4. Laser Nephrological Surgery 5. Surgery for cancers of the Kidney, Bladder and Urinary Tract in Men, Women and Children.

See also

References

External links
 Official Website

Hospital buildings completed in 2017
2017 establishments in Uganda
Hospitals in Uganda
Wakiso District